Taylor Jacklyn Kornieck (born November 22, 1998) is an American professional soccer player who plays as a midfielder for National Women's Soccer League club San Diego Wave FC and the United States national team.

Early life
Born in Troy, Michigan, Kornieck grew up in Henderson, Nevada and was a 2015 NSCAA All-American at Coronado High School where she served as team captain and finished her prep career with 84 goals and 44 assists. As a senior, she was named Gatorade Player of the Year for Nevada as she scored 56 goals and led her school to the Division I state championship. A standout high school athlete, Kornieck also played outside hitter for the school volleyball team and wide receiver for the flag football team. At club level, Kornieck played soccer for the San Diego Surf and Las Vegas Premier ECNL clubs, captained the Nevada Olympic Development Program team and was selected to the Region IV ODP team in 2015.

Colorado Buffaloes
Kornieck was a four-year starter for the Colorado Buffaloes at the University of Colorado Boulder from 2016 to 2019 while also earning a degree in integrative physiology. During her freshman season, Kornieck scored 11 goals for the Buffaloes in 22 matches, earning the Pac-12 Freshman of the Year award. Following her junior year, Kornieck became the first All-American for the Buffaloes since 2006, scoring 9 goals in 16 starts. She earned All Pac-12 honors every year of her collegiate career. Kornieck left Colorado as the program's all-time leader in points (102) and assists (24).

During the 2019 college offseason, Kornieck joined UWS club LA Galaxy OC, making two appearances as the team won the National Championship.

Club career

Orlando Pride (2020–2021) 
On January 16, 2020, Kornieck was selected with the third overall pick in the 2020 NWSL College Draft by Orlando Pride who traded up during the draft in order to select her. Taken third overall, Kornieck became the highest draft selection in Orlando Pride history. On February 11, 2020, she signed a one-year contract with an option for an additional year. With preseason and the ensuing NWSL schedule canceled in March due to the coronavirus pandemic, the NWSL eventually scheduled a smaller 2020 NWSL Challenge Cup replacement tournament in June. However, on June 22, Orlando Pride withdrew from the tournament following positive COVID-19 tests among both players and staff.

Kornieck returned to Orlando following her loan spell ahead of the 2021 season, making her professional NWSL debut for the club on April 10, 2021, starting and scoring a 44th-minute equalizer in the team's Challenge Cup opener against Racing Louisville.

MSV Duisburg (2020) 
In September 2020, having been unable to play for Orlando, Kornieck joined German Bundesliga club MSV Duisburg on loan for the rest of the year. She made her debut on September 11, 2020, starting in a 2–0 defeat to Bayer Leverkusen. On October 31 she made her DFB-Pokal Frauen debut in a second round match against third-tier team Borussia Bocholt. She received a straight red card for serious foul play in the 38th minute and later handed a four-game ban by the German FA. She scored her first goal on November 14 in a 5–3 defeat to Werder Bremen.

San Diego Wave FC (2022–present) 
On January 18, 2022, Kornieck was traded with the rights to Emily van Egmond to San Diego Wave FC in exchange for $125,000 in allocation money and San Diego's natural second-round pick in the 2024 NWSL Draft.

International career

Youth
Kornieck has represented the United States at under-18, under-19 and under-20 levels. In 2016, she served as the team captain for the under-18 side. Kornieck scored her first international goal with the under-19s in July 2017 in a 2–0 win over England. In 2018, Kornieck was called up for the La Manga U20 tournament but was forced to withdraw through injury.

Senior
In June 2022, Kornieck received her first senior international call-up. At 6'1", she became the tallest player in the program's history to earn a cap with the national team. She made her United States debut on June 25, 2022, entering as a 73rd-minute substitute and scoring in the 90th minute in a 3–0 friendly win over Colombia. Kornieck scored her second international goal in a 5-0 win over New Zealand when she headed in a Rose Lavelle corner at the 80th minute.

Personal life
Taylor's mother, Kristin, played professional volleyball in Europe. Her older brother, Nick, played basketball collegiately for Doane Tigers and CSU Dominguez Hills Toros.

Career statistics

College

Club 
.

International

International goals

Honors
LA Galaxy OC
UWS National Championship: 2019
United States
 CONCACAF Women's Championship: 2022
 SheBelieves Cup: 2023
Individual
Pac-12 Freshman of the Year: 2016

References

Match reports

External links
 Colorado profile
 DfB profile
 
 Profile at Orlando City

1998 births
Living people
People from Henderson, Nevada
Sportspeople from Nevada
Soccer players from Nevada
Soccer players from Michigan
Women's association football midfielders
American women's soccer players
United States women's international soccer players
Colorado Buffaloes women's soccer players
Orlando Pride draft picks
MSV Duisburg (women) players
Orlando Pride players
San Diego Wave FC players
Frauen-Bundesliga players
National Women's Soccer League players
American expatriate soccer players in Germany
American expatriate women's soccer players